James of Manug was a Christian martyr.

He was a native of Manug, of the Absu area of Lower Egypt. He studied at Absu. During a period of Christian persecution he professed belief in Christianity at Farama. With two other believers, Abraham and John of Samanoud, two natives of Gamndui, he was martyred. His tongue was cut out, he was blinded and then, finally beheaded.

Their feast day is celebrated on August 10 in the Coptic Church, or August 11 in the Ethiopian Orthodox Tewahedo Church.

References
Holweck, F. G. A Biographical Dictionary of the Saints. St. Louis, MO: B. Herder Book Co. 1924.

Christian saints in unknown century
Year of birth missing
Year of death missing
Coptic Orthodox saints
Groups of Christian martyrs of the Roman era